The ruteline genus Chrysina, or jewel scarabs (not to be confused with jewel beetles, which are a different family), is a large genus of brightly colored, often metallic iridescent species, ranging from the southwestern edge of the United States as far south as Venezuela and Ecuador. The genus includes all the species formerly known as Plusiotis. The larvae live in rotting logs, while the adults commonly feed on foliage; they tend to be found in pine, juniper, or pine-oak forests, most commonly between  elevation. They are most diverse in countries such as Guatemala, where as many as 15 species can be found in a single location, but there are only 4 species which occur in the United States.

These beetles are very popular among collectors; many species are polymorphic, with rare color variants that can command high prices. One such specimen was featured on the cover of National Geographic Magazine. The majority of species are bright green, but metallic silver and gold are also common colors, and may be combined with green as in the common Chrysina gloriosa from the Madrean sky islands region.

Particularly attractive specimens were reported to sell for as much as $500 in 2007. 

The genus name is from Greek χρύσινος (chrysinos), "gold-coloured".

Species

Chrysina adelaida (Hope, 1841)
Chrysina adolphi Chevrolat, 1859
Chrysina alexae Monzón, 2017
Chrysina alfredolaui (Hawks, 1995)
Chrysina alphabarrerai (Morón, 1981)
Chrysina amalia (Burmeister, 1844)
Chrysina antonkozlovi Monzón, 2017
Chrysina arellanoi Monzón, 2012
Chrysina argenteola (H. Bates, 1888)
Chrysina aurigans (Rothschild & Jordan, 1894)
Chrysina aurilisternum Perez-Flores, Villagomez & Galindo, 2016
Chrysina auripes Gray, 1832
Chrysina aurofoveata (Morón, 1981)
Chrysina auropunctata (Ohaus, 1913)
Chrysina aurora (Boucard, 1875)
Chrysina badeni (Boucard, 1878)
Chrysina baileyana Monzón, 2010
Chrysina batesi (Boucard, 1875)
Chrysina beckeri H. Bates, 1889
Chrysina benesi Pokorný & Curoe, 2012
Chrysina beraudi (Warner, Hawks & Bruyea, 1992)
Chrysina beyeri (Skinner, 1905)
Chrysina blackalleri Monzón & García, 2011
Chrysina boucardi (Sallé, 1878)
Chrysina brevis (Rothschild & Jordan, 1894)
Chrysina bruyeai (Hawks, 1999)
Chrysina cavei Hawks & Bruyea, 1999
Chrysina centralis (Morón, 1990)
Chrysina chalcothea (H. Bates, 1888)
Chrysina chimalapensis Mora-Aguilar, Curoe, Delgado & Ramírez-Ponce 2018
Chrysina chloreis (H. Bates, 1888)
Chrysina chrysargyrea (Sallé, 1874)
Chrysina chrysopedila (H. Bates, 1888)
Chrysina citlaltepetlamayatli (Blackaller-Bages & Delgado, 1994)
Chrysina clavellina Monzón, Blackaller, & Hawks, 2020
Chrysina clypealis (Rothschild & Jordan, 1894)
Chrysina colima (Morón, 1992)
Chrysina confusa (Ohaus, 1913)
Chrysina costata (Blanchard, 1850)
Chrysina crassimargo (Rothschild & Jordan, 1894)
Chrysina cunninghami (Curoe, 1999)
Chrysina cupreomarginata (F. Bates, 1904)
Chrysina curoei (Warner, LeBlanc, Hawks & Bruyea, 1992)
Chrysina cusuquensis (Curoe, 1994)
Chrysina dianae (Ratcliffe & Taylor, 1992)
Chrysina difficilis (Morón, 1990)
Chrysina diversa (Ohaus, 1912)
Chrysina donthomasi Monzón & García, 2011
Chrysina dzidorhum (Arnaud, 1994)
Chrysina ericsmithi (Monzón & Cano, 1999)
Chrysina erubescens H. Bates, 1889
Chrysina expansa (Ohaus, 1913)
Chrysina eyai Curoe, 2012
Chrysina falcifera Hawks, 2017
Chrysina flohri (Ohaus, 1905)
Chrysina gaitalica Curoe, 2012
Chrysina galbina Hawks, 2017
Chrysina giesberti Monzón, 2010
Chrysina gloriosa (Leconte, 1854)
Chrysina gorda Delgado, 2003
Chrysina guatemalensis (Monzón, Cano & Bailey, 1999)
Chrysina guaymi (Curoe, 2001)
Chrysina halffteri (Morón, 1990)
Chrysina hawksi Monzón, 2010
Chrysina howdenorum (Morón, 1990)
Chrysina intermedia (Ohaus, 1913)
Chrysina juxtaprasina Hawks, 2017
Chrysina kalinini Zubov & Ivshin, 2019
Chrysina karschi (Nonfried, 1891)
Chrysina lacordairei (Boucard, 1875)
Chrysina laniventris (Sturm, 1843)
Chrysina lecontei (Horn, 1882)
Chrysina limbata (Rothschild & Jordan, 1894)
Chrysina luteomarginata (Ohaus, 1913)
Chrysina macropus (Francillon, 1795)
Chrysina magnistriata (Morón, 1990)
Chrysina maishei Monzón, 2017
Chrysina marginata (Waterhouse, 1871)
Chrysina mercedesae Barria, 2022
Chrysina miguelangeli Nogueira & Curoe, 2012
Chrysina misteca (Morón, 1990)
Chrysina modesta (Sturm, 1843)
Chrysina moroni (Curoe & Beraud, 1994)
Chrysina nogueirai (Morón, 1992)
Chrysina ofidiodontophallica Curoe, 2011
Chrysina optima (H. Bates, 1888)
Chrysina oreicola (Morón, 1992)
Chrysina orizabae (H. Bates, 1889)
Chrysina pastori (Curoe, 1994)
Chrysina paulseni Hawks, 2017
Chrysina pehlkei (Ohaus, 1930)
Chrysina peruviana Kirby, 1828
Chrysina plusiotina (Ohaus, 1912)
Chrysina porioni Monzón & Hawks, 2020
Chrysina prasina (Boucard, 1878)
Chrysina pricei Hawks, 2020
Chrysina prototelica (Morón & Howden, 1992)
Chrysina psittacina (Sturm, 1843)
Chrysina purpurata (Morón, 1990)
Chrysina purulhensis (Monzón & Warner, 1993)
Chrysina quetzalcoatli (Morón, 1990)
Chrysina quiche (Morón, 1990)
Chrysina ratcliffei (Morón, 1990)
Chrysina resplendens (Boucard, 1875)
Chrysina robackeri Hawks, 2020
Chrysina rodriguezi (Boucard, 1878)
Chrysina sagacita Hawks, 2017
Chrysina sallaei (Boucard, 1875)
Chrysina schusteri (Monzon, Cano & Bailey, 1999)
Chrysina sirenicola (Solís & Morón, 1995)
Chrysina spectabilis (Ratcliffe & Jameson, 1992)
Chrysina strasseni (Ohaus, 1924)
Chrysina tapantina (Morón, 1992)
Chrysina taylori (Morón, 1990)
Chrysina tecunumani (Cano & Morón, 1995)
Chrysina terroni (Morón, 1990)
Chrysina transvolcanica (Morón & Nogueira, 2016)
Chrysina tricolor (Ohaus, 1922)
Chrysina triumphalis Morón, 1990
Chrysina tuerckheimi (Ohaus, 1913)
Chrysina valentini Zubov & Ivshin, 2019
Chrysina veraguana (Ohaus, 1922)
Chrysina victorina (Hope, 1841)
Chrysina woodi (Horn, 1884)
Chrysina woodruffi Monzón, 2017
Chrysina xalixteca (Morón, 1992)
Chrysina zapoteca (Morón, 1990)

Metallic color mechanism
Research has shown that the elytra of Chrysina are composed of about 70 chitinous layers of exoskeleton. The different reflective indices and spacing of the layers cause light of different wavelengths to be selectively refracted through them and by them in different phases, leading to a metallic appearance, and also leads to different specimens having different colors.

References

External links
 Generic Guide to New World Scarab Beetles

Rutelinae